Guiseley School is a mixed secondary school and sixth form located in Guiseley in the City of Leeds, West Yorkshire, England.

Guiseley became a foundation school in January 2014 and is administered by Leeds City Council and the Aireborough Learning Partnership. Guiseley School offers GCSEs and BTECs as programmes of study for pupils, while students in the sixth form have the option to study from a range of A-levels and further BTECs.

History 
In September 2006 the school was damaged by a tornado and floods during a freak storm and had to be temporarily closed.

In September 2011 Guiseley School became one of the first schools in the UK to completely ban skirts as part of their school uniform. The school released a statement saying that they believed that short skirts were contributing to the sexualisation of children. With a new uniform introduced in 2019, this ban has since been revoked.

In September 2015 46 pupils and 4 staff members from the school became ill with food poisoning while on a school trip to Belgium. A total of 80 Year 11 pupils had gone on the school trip and those who were taken ill were treated at seven hospitals around Zeebrugge. Those pupils who were not infected were taken to a hostel. All of the pupils and staff eventually recovered.

In January 2019 plans to replace most of the existing school buildings with a new development were approved. The plans were expected to be completed in February 2021.

In March 2020 Department for Education statistics revealed that Guiseley School received the lowest amount of funding per pupil of all Leeds state secondary schools, with £4673 per head, although this figure was still above the national average of £4556 per pupil for all state schools in England.

Notable former pupils
Peter Grant, singer
Andy Haldane, chief economist at the Bank of England
Josh Windass, footballer for Rangers F.C.
Alan Greaves, archaeologist

Notable former staff
Frank Hadden, rugby union coach

Notable staff
Ian Moor, Stars In Their Eyes, Champion of Champions

References

External links
Guiseley School official website

Secondary schools in Leeds
Foundation schools in Leeds
Guiseley